Chronicles of Chaos is a trilogy of fantasy novels by John C. Wright.

It contains the novels Orphans of Chaos (2005), Fugitives of Chaos (2006) and Titans of Chaos (2007).

2000s fantasy novels
Tor Books books